An online community of practice (OCoP), also known as a virtual community of practice (VCoP), is a community of practice (CoP) that is developed on, and is maintained using the Internet. To qualify as an OCoP, the characteristics of a community of practice (CoP) as described by Lave and Wenger must be met. To this end, an OCoP must include active members who are practitioners, or "experts," in the specific domain of interest. Members must participate in a process of collective learning within their domain. Additionally, social structures must be created within the community to assist in knowledge creation and sharing. Knowledge must be shared and meaning negotiated within an appropriate context. Community members must learn through both instruction-based learning and group discourse. Finally, multiple dimensions must facilitate the long-term management of support as well as enable immediate synchronous interactions.

To some, a VCoP is a misnomer as the original concept of a CoP was based around situated learning in a co-located setting.  However, with increasing globalization and the continued growth of the Internet many now claim that virtual CoPs do exist (e.g. Dubé, Bourhis & Jacob, 2005; Murillo, 2006; Zarb, 2006; Hara & Hew, 2007; Murillo, 2008).  For example, some claim that a wiki (such as Wikipedia) is a virtual CoP (Bryant, Forte & Bruckman, 2005), others argue that the essence of a community is that it is place-based – a community of place.

There is also debate on the very term  since the community is real though the form of communication is mostly, if not entirely, computer-mediated. Few believe that a community of practice may be formed without any face-to-face meetings whatsoever. In fact, many leading CoP thinkers stress the importance of such meetings. However some researchers argue that a VCoP's high use of ICT, changes some of its characteristics and introduces new complexities and ambiguities, thus justifying the creation of the term and area of study (Kim, 2004; Zarb, 2006).

Some of the other terms used have been (in chronological order) online , computer-mediated (Etzioni & Etzioni, 1999), electronic (Wasko & Faraj, 2000) and distributed (Hildreth, Kimble & Wright, 1998). Wenger et al., 2002; Kimble & Hildreth, 2005.). As the mode of communication can involve face-to-face, telephone and letter, and the defining feature is its distributed nature. For a comparison between Virtual Learning Communities (VLCs) with Distributed Communities of Practice (DCoP), see Couros & Kesten (2003).

Recent research has produced evidence that increases in the sharing of tacit knowledge, which is very much inherent within CoP theory, may take place, albeit to a lesser degree, in a VCoP scenario even though such systems make use of written word (Zarb, 2006). This is spurring interest in what is sometimes referred to as community-driven knowledge management or community-based knowledge management, where CoP and VCoP theory is harnessed, nourished and supported within the broader organisational setting.

Online communities of practice 

Communities of Practice like Sap's SDN developer network, Adobe's XMP forum, Sermo for physicians, or domain-specific corporate-internal communities such as those found at HP, revolve around people's professional or vocational needs for connections, information, identity, and sense of belonging. Communities of practice are about what people do for a living.

They address the needs that people have which can not easily be satisfied with traditional resources such as broadcast media, formal publications, academia, and ad hoc associations or relationships. Online communities of practice run the gamut from forums, faqs, to email list serves. Offline communities of practice include user groups such as ASUG and eBay's annual “Live” event.

Communities of practice provide a critical resource to professionals who want and need recommendations, pointers, tips and tricks, best practices, insights and innovations. Part of what makes a community of practice strong is the aggregation of relevance; that is, people and information related to a coherent set of topics which certain people will find interesting, useful, and potentially profitable. Communities of practice lift us up to support us, to help us achieve our aspirations, reach our goals, and to be of service.

 argue that virtual communities change the way we think of community and that technology stewardship is a key element of virtual communities of practice by making virtual communities independent of any one technology.

Current research 
Research suggests that through extended connections, reflections, and online discourse, OCoPs can enable the growth of a collective identity between the members of a community. OCoPs provide a virtual space in which people who might normally never meet can come together, share stories and experiences, and solve problems pertaining to the domain interest. The evolving technologies of the Internet allow for an extension of traditional communities in geographic and cultural ways, crossing borders and languages to include experts from around the world. Additionally, people who are engaged in emergent and uncommon practices, or who have few local resources can become members of online communities. OCoPs allow for the enculturation of newcomers to a practitioners' community. In this way, both experienced and novice practitioners learn together and help shape the personal identities of the members and the collective identities of the greater practice. Virtual Communities of Practice have been suggested to be especially effective for increasing teacher efficacy and reducing professional isolation in computer science education.

Some questions remain as to what level of participation in an online community constitutes legitimate membership of an OCoP. Two types of participation have been identified to distinguish between levels of activity. Active participation means that members regularly contribute to community discourse. Peripheral participation, also called “lurking,” means that members read without contributing themselves. While it is preferable to have more active participation, some recent studies have concluded that peripheral participation is normal in online communities. Though these members may not contribute to the community discourse, they nevertheless learn from observing, and as such are legitimate participants. Despite this, some academicians assert that peripheral participation can threaten an OCoP if more members lurk than actively participate.

Social networking 
Web 2.0 applications and social networks have increased the ease with which OCoPs are created and maintained.

The structural characteristics of a community of practice include a shared domain of interest, a notion of community, and members who are also practitioners. Only with all three characteristics present does a group become a community. A single Internet application, though it may incorporate one of these characteristics, may not be enough to fully support a full community in practice. The continued development of Web 2.0 technologies and the ensuing evolution of vast social networks have easily enabled incorporating these characteristics within an OCoP.

Social networks allow for the creation of clearly defined domains of interest in which dialogue and interactive conversations create communities with common and recorded histories. Social network tools allow members of OCoPs to create and share knowledge and develop cultural historical processes.

Advantages 
An online community of practice enables participants to read, submit and receive advice and feedback from the community to the extent that they wish. Those who choose to participate in a strictly receptive manner (i.e. only reading) can still gain knowledge and skills from the communal resources, which is especially valuable to beginning practitioners. OCoPs give beginners, who might not feel comfortable sharing their knowledge, an opportunity to learn from veteran colleagues beyond their immediate geographic area through observation and absorption of information and dialogue. The veterans lend a degree of legitimacy to the community, as well as to the experiences of the new members. The result is an atmosphere of mentorship for novices. As new practitioners gain understanding and expertise, they are become more comfortable with sharing their own backgrounds and perspectives with the OCoP further expanding the field of knowledge.

The asynchronous nature of many forums (e.g. blogs, wikis) allows participants to be involved at their own convenience. The forums maintain a record of ideas, discourse and resources, creating an archive of expertise for a field of practice that can be accessed at any time from nearly anywhere.

Professionals who work alone or are the only person from their field of practice in a work setting have indicated a reduced sense of isolation after participating in an OCoP. The contributions of the group help identify the similar and disparate characteristics of a practitioner resulting in both a sense of community identity as well as an individual's identity within the community.

Disadvantages

Technology 
A common hindrance to participation in online communities of practice is the technology required for involvement. Members who do not have ready access to computers, PDAs or similar web-accessing technology are precluded from taking part in an OCoP. Members with slow or unreliable equipment are unable to participate to their full potential and may find the technical difficulties so discouraging they withdraw completely. Likewise, the technical aptitude required to participate online can be daunting to individuals who are uncomfortable with their computer skills.

Forums 
The nature of an online forum can cause problems in creating a sense of community. The lack of physical identification and body language in text-only forums can make it difficult to foster meaningful connections between members. Without the sense of connectivity with other practitioners, involvement falters. The flexibility of most forums, which allows participants to contribute at any time, also makes it is easy to not participate at all. Moderators of an OCoP forum have to reassert the presence of the OCoP through activities, events, and occasions in order to promote involvement. Individuals who do not participate for a period of time and return can find the onslaught of information and posts overwhelming and discouraging.

Diversity of participants 
The varying levels of knowledge, skill and experience within an OCoP can deter less confident members from participating in the community.  The diverse nature of a community can also create linguistic and cultural barriers to participation. Discourse and jargon can create confusion and misunderstanding for non-native speakers and clarifying the communication errors online can prove difficult.

Examples of online collaborative tools 
Online collaborative tools are the means and mediums of working together on the Internet that facilitate collaboration by individuals who may be located in vastly different geographical areas. They may include online tools specifically developed to address the needs of communities of practice including members around the world or other types of tools and forums that are available and used for OCoPs.

Social networking sites 
The first social network site (SNS), SixDegrees.com, was created in 1997. Examples of social networking sites include the following:
 LinkedIn
 Facebook
 MySpace

Virtual worlds 
Virtual worlds, which are online community-based environments, are now being used in both educational and professional settings. In education, these virtual worlds are being used to communicate information and allow for face-to-face virtual interaction between students and teachers. They also allow students to access and use resources provided by the teacher in both the physical classroom as well as in the virtual classroom. In professional environments, virtual training is used to provide virtual visits to company locations as well as to provide training that can be converted from classroom content to online, virtual world content. Virtual worlds provide training simulations for what could otherwise be hazardous situations.

Companies are using virtual worlds to exchange information and ideas. In addition, virtual worlds are being used for technical support and business improvements. Case studies document how virtual worlds are used to provide teamwork and training simulations that would not have otherwise been as accessible. Examples of virtual worlds used include the following:
 Second Life
 Whyville

Information sharing 
Online tools are available for the sharing of information. This information can be intended for a wide range of audiences, from two participants to many participants. These tools can be used to communication new thoughts or ideas and can provide a setting necessary for collaborative knowledge building. Activities associated with these tools can be integrated into the presentation of online classroom and/or training materials.

Examples of tools that allow information sharing include the following:
 Wikis
 Google Docs
 Blogs

Decision making
There are online tools and platforms that enable, in different ways, deliberation and voting. These are being used by political organizations, notably Podemos, in Spain. Examples of tools and platforms include the following:
 Loomio
 Reddit
 Appgree
 Agora Voting

See also
 Community of practice
 Computer-supported collaborative learning
 Network of practice
 Online ethnography
 Online participation
 Virtual community
 Virtual team
 Virtual volunteering

Notes

References
Ackerman, & G. Mark, (Eds.), Proceedings of GROUP International Conference on Supporting Group Work. (pp. 11–20). New York: ACM Press.
Bryant, S. L., Forte, A. & Bruckman, A. (2005). Becoming Wikipedian: transformation of participation in a collaborative online encyclopledia. In K. Schmidt, M. Pendergast, M.

Etzioni, A., & Etzioni, O. (1999). Face-to-face and computer-mediated communities, A comparative analysis. The Information Society, 15, 241–248.

Kim, A.J. (2004). "Emergent Purpose." Musings of a Social Architect. January 24, 2004. Retrieved April 4, 2006
Murillo, E. (2006). Searching for virtual communities of practice in the Usenet discussion network: combining quantitative and qualitative methods to identify the constructs of Wenger's theory. PhD thesis. University of Bradford.
Murillo, E. (2008). Searching Usenet for virtual Communities of Practice: using mixed methods to identify the constructs of Wenger's theory.  Information Research, 13(4) paper 386.
 Preece, J. & Maloney-Krichmar, D. (2003) Online Communities: Focusing on Sociability and Usability. In J. Jacko and A. Sears, A. (Eds.), The human-computer interaction handbook (pp. 596–620).Mahwah, NJ: Lawrence Erlbaum Associates.

 Wenger, E. (1998). Communities of Practice: Learning, Meaning and Identity. Cambridge: Cambridge University Press.

 
Zarb, M.P (2006). Modelling Participation in Virtual Communities-of-Practice. LSE MSc ADMIS Dissertation: Distinction, Accessed from https://lse.academia.edu.

External links
 ( A critical review of virtual CoPs )
 Where is the Action in Virtual Communities of Practice? Another critical review of virtual CoPs
 Communities of Practice: Going Virtual
 Distributed Design Teams as Communities of Practice
 Virtual Communities of Practice: Differentiated Consequences for Individuals in Two Organisational Contexts
 Knowledge Networking: Structure and Performance in Networks of Practice
 Zarb, M.P (2006). Modelling Participation in Virtual Communities-of-Practice
 DARnet wiki - Action Research with Distributed Communities of Practice

Types of communities